Rahamim Checkol (born May 8, 1988) is an Ethiopian-born Israeli association footballer. He currently plays for Ironi Modi'in. At international level, Checkol was capped at levels from under-18 to under-21.

Early life 
Checkol was born in Ethiopia to an Ethiopian-Jewish family. He immigrated with his family to Israel.

Club career

Maccabi Tel Aviv 
On 1 September 2011, Checkol was transferred to Maccabi Tel Aviv for a fee of US$350,000 plus Hatem Abd Elhamed.

References

1988 births
Living people
Ethiopian Jews
Ethiopian emigrants to Israel
Citizens of Israel through Law of Return
Israeli Jews
Israeli footballers
Association football defenders
Footballers from Ashdod
F.C. Ashdod players
Maccabi Tel Aviv F.C. players
Maccabi Yavne F.C. players
Hakoah Maccabi Amidar Ramat Gan F.C. players
Hapoel Rishon LeZion F.C. players
Hapoel Nof HaGalil F.C. players
Hapoel Ashdod F.C. players
Ironi Modi'in F.C. players
Israeli Premier League players
Liga Leumit players
Israel under-21 international footballers

Jewish footballers